The Arena Football League 20 Greatest Players was compiled in 2006 to show the league's top 20 players in its 20-year history.

References

Arena Football League trophies and awards